A vascular ring is a congenital defect in which there is an abnormal formation of the aorta and/or its surrounding blood vessels. The trachea and esophagus are completely encircled and sometimes compressed by a "ring" formed by these vessels, which can lead to breathing and digestive difficulties.

Most often this is because of persistence of the double aortic arch after the second month of fetal life.

Presentation
The two arches surround the esophagus and trachea which, if sufficiently constrictive, may cause breathing or swallowing difficulties despite medical therapies.

A less common ring is present with a right aortic arch instead of the usual left-sided aortic arch. This compresses the esophagus and trachea because of the persistence of a ductal ligament (from fetal circulation) that may connect between the aorta on the front and the left subclavian artery posteriorly going to the left arm.

Symptoms

Diagnosis
Infants with vascular rings typically present before 12 months with respiratory or esophageal symptoms like stridor, wheezing, cough, dysphagia, or difficulty feeding. The stridor improves with neck extension, differentiating from laryngomalacia which is relieved by prone or upright positioning, and will not be relieved with corticosteroids or epinephrine, unlike croup. Diagnosis requires a high degree of clinical suspicion and can be confirmed with barium contrast esophagogram for those with esophageal symptoms, bronchoscopy, or CT or MRI.

Treatment
It is sometimes treated with surgery.

References

External links 

Congenital vascular defects